The Women's 100 metre butterfly S9 event at the 2010 Commonwealth Games took place on 9 October 2010, at the SPM Swimming Pool Complex, Delhi. Natalie du Toit of South Africa created a World Record for this event with a time of 1:06.70 in Beijing, China in 2008 Summer Paralympics.

Finals

References

Aquatics at the 2010 Commonwealth Games
Women's 100 metre butterfly
2010 in women's swimming